William Howard Sublette (May 30, 1880 – December 29, 1955) was an American Negro league pitcher between 1908 and 1910.

A native of Nashville, Tennessee, Sublette attended Fisk University and played for the Leland Giants in 1908 and again in 1910. He died in Chicago, Illinois in 1955 at age 75.

References

External links
Baseball statistics and player information from Baseball-Reference Black Baseball Stats and Seamheads

1880 births
1955 deaths
Leland Giants players
Baseball pitchers
Baseball players from Nashville, Tennessee
20th-century African-American people